Henry Copeland, (6 June 1839 – 22 June 1904) was a member of the New South Wales Legislative Assembly.

Copeland was born in Hull, Yorkshire, England. Aged 18 years, he arrived in Williamstown, Victoria and spent around 15 years on the goldfields as a digger, farmer and contractor. In 1863 he visited England where he married Hannah  Beecroft on 20 April. He would later marry her sister Mary and had 4 sons and 7 daughters from both marriages. He moved to New South Wales in 1872.

Copeland was elected unopposed to the New South Wales Mining Board in 1874. He entered the New South Wales Legislative Assembly and represented six different seats between 1877 and 1900.

He was briefly Secretary for Public Works in the Stuart ministry appointed in January 1883, defeated in the resulting ministerial by-election and was returned to the assembly at the East Sydney by-election held the following week, before resigning from the ministry in March 1883 following a speech he made, whilst intoxicated, at the St Patrick's day banquet. He was Secretary for Lands in the Jennings ministry from February 1886 to January 1887. In October 1891, when the third Dibbs ministry Government was formed, he was again appointed Secretary for Lands from October 1891 until August 1894.

He was appointed Agent-General for New South Wales in London in May 1900, serving until 18 July 1903.

His brother was the Rev. G.D. Copeland of St Stephen's, London.

References

 

1839 births
1904 deaths
Members of the New South Wales Legislative Assembly
19th-century Australian politicians
Agents-General for New South Wales
People from Kingston upon Hull
English emigrants to colonial Australia